Sean McLaughlin (pronounced Seen) is an anchor of the 10pm newscast and formerly the Chief Meteorologist at KPHO CBS 5 in Phoenix Arizona.

Career 
Prior to this stint in Phoenix, McLaughlin was chief meteorologist for MSNBC, joining the United States-based 24-hour cable news television network in July 2004.  He was also the meteorologist on the Sunday editions of NBC's The Today Show.  He contributed to NBC Weather Plus+, NBC Nightly News, and other NBC News/MSNBC/CNBC programs.  McLaughlin's prior stint in Phoenix was as the longtime Chief Meteorologist, as well as anchor and general assignment reporter at NBC affiliate KPNX Channel 12. Currently he is a meteorologist, news anchor and reporter for KPHO CBS 5 in Phoenix. McLaughlin has won several Emmys. 

His hometown is Belmond, Iowa.

Education

McLaughlin graduated from Iowa State University with a bachelor's degree in broadcast journalism where he was a member of the Fraternity Tau Kappa Epsilon. He holds a certificate in meteorology from Mississippi State University.

External links
AZ Central Article on MSNBC job
MSNBC Bio
NBC Weather Plus bio
Sean McLaughlin bio
Journalism graduate is weathercaster for NBC

Living people
Year of birth missing (living people)
Mississippi State University alumni
American male journalists
Iowa State University alumni
NBC News people
People from Wright County, Iowa